The Willard D. Purdy Junior High and Vocational School, also known as Purdy School, is a historic school building located on Third Street in Marshfield, Wisconsin, United States.  Built in 1919, it was the first junior high school in Marshfield.  It was named after a local soldier who died in World War I.  The building was designed in the Collegiate Gothic style by Childs & Smith from Chicago.  A substantial addition to the school in 1926 increased the size by more than three-fold and was designed by architects Parkinson & Dockendorff from La Crosse, Wisconsin.  The building was listed on the National Register of Historic Places in 1992.

References

Buildings and structures in Wood County, Wisconsin
Gothic Revival architecture in Wisconsin
School buildings completed in 1919
School buildings on the National Register of Historic Places in Wisconsin
National Register of Historic Places in Wood County, Wisconsin
1919 establishments in Wisconsin